Layla bint al-Minhal (also Laila) was an Arab woman during the spread of Islam. She was a contemporary to the Islamic prophet Muhammad, and the wife of Khalid Ibn al Walid, one of the greatest generals of all time.

Layla was the daughter of Al-Minhal and was later also known as Umm Tamim. Because of her beauty, she was pursued by many men, but rejected their advances. Firstly she married Malik ibn Nuwayra as a tribe pact agreement, a companion whom the majority of sources claim to be a misogynistic figure due to his inflicted "abuse and "captivation" of Layla and easy seduction towards Sajah. Eventually, Malik faced execution due to treason against Muhammad and his successor Abu Bakr, thus she supported and married Khalid Ibn walid, the Rashidun general.

Death of Malik ibn Nuwayra's tribe and his death

Following the death of the Prophet Muhammed, many tribes on the Arabian Peninsula apostized and left the religion of Islam. This is known as the Ridda Wars. The Caliph Abu Bakr sent Khalid ibn al-Walid to fight and defeat the Banu Sulaim tribe. On the way there, Khalid traversed across the land of the Banu Tamim of which Malik belonged to. Khalid has heard of reports that Malik had begun to speak negatively of the Prophet Muhammed and was in some cases, insulting the Prophet Muhammed.

Khalid was instructed that he could inspect the tribes he was passing through to check if they were Muslim or not. It was decided that if the call to prayer was made and people came to the Mosque to pray, then it would be concluded that they were Muslims. On the other hand, if they did not then that would suggest that they had left Islam. Khalid then sent out his partisans to check whether they had made Salah or not. Some of them stated that Salah was performed however others stated that Salah was not performed.

According to a report, the man who usually would call out the Azan was absent and thus no call to prayer was heard. Malik and his men then began an armed resistance against the forces of Khalid and were subsequently defeated. Malik was then brought to Khalid who questioned him in regards to his agreement with Sajah (an Arab Christian who claimed prophethood) to which he failed to respond and indicated that he had left Islam through comments of disregard for the Prophet Muhammed. Khalid concluded that Malik's armed resistance, his co-operation with the Sajah and his disparaging comments of the Prophet Muhammed were completely unacceptable. As a result of these three factors, Khalid decided that Malik was to be executed.

One of the those who was alongside Khalid, Qatada ibn al-Nu'man claimed that the people of Banu Tamim had performed Salah and therefore complained to Abu Bakr in Medina. Moreover, Umar ibn al-Khattab believed that Khalid should be removed from his post as a general of the Rashidun army due to his impulsive behavior. Khalid then returned to Medina and was questioned by Abu Bakr about his actions. Abu Bakr then concluded that it was a mistake by Khalid but it was not reasonable to dismiss him over this error of judgement.

The reasons as to why Abu Bakr did not punish Khalid for his actions were due to the Prophet's statement in which he said "Khalid is the sword of Allah against the disbelievers". It was also because of a similar incident during the life of the Prophet Muhammed. The Prophet Muhammed had sent Khalid ibn Waleed to the tribe of Banu Jadhimah in order to convey Islam to them. The people responded by saying: “saba’na, saba’na”, which means “We have become Sabeans”, but which was also used in the general sense of changing one's religion. According to Khalid they had not become Muslims and he gave the order for their execution. When the news of their execution reached the Prophet Muhammed he said: “O Allah, I dissociate myself from what Khalid has done". However, when Khalid returned the Prophet Muhammed did not punish him or dismiss him and sent him on various missions such as the Expedition of Khalid ibn al-Walid in which he destroyed the temple and statue dedicated to the pagan goddess Al-Uzza. In Jumada al-Awwal 631, he was sent on a mission to spread Islam to Banu Harith ibn Ka’b.  He was also sent to the expedition to Ukaydir ibn ‘Abdul Malik.

Khalid was also praised by the Prophet Muhammed for his fighting during the Battle of Mu'tah in 629 and his successful tactical withdrawal which saved the Muslims from utter destruction. The Prophet Muhammed was reported as saying on the day of Mu'tah “then the standard was taken up by a Sword from amongst the Swords of Allah, and upon his hands did Allah grant victory". Abu Bakr responded to Umar's comment on dismissing Khalid by saying "I will not sheath the sword of Allah". Instead Abu Bakr acted in the same way the Prophet Muhammed had in the case of Banu Jadhimah, Abu Bakr gave the blood money to Malik's brother Mutammim and ordered the release of all captives taken by Khalid.

It was decided that if the call to prayer was made and people came to the Mosque to pray, then it would be concluded that they were Muslims. On the other hand, if they did not then that would suggest that they had left Islam. Khalid then sent out his partisans to check whether they had made Salah or not. Some of them stated that Salah was performed however others stated that Salah was not performed.

According to a report, the man who usually would call out the Azan was absent and thus no call to prayer was heard. Malik and his men then began an armed resistance against the forces of Khalid and were subsequently defeated. Malik was then brought to Khalid who questioned him in regards to his agreement with Sajah (an Arab Christian who claimed prophethood) to which he failed to respond and indicated that he had left Islam through comments of disregard for the Prophet Muhammed. Khalid concluded that Malik's armed resistance, his co-operation with Sajah and his disparaging comments of the Prophet Muhammed were completely unacceptable. Khalid decided that Malik was to be executed.
When arrested in November 632 AD, Malik was asked by Khalid ibn Walid about his crimes. Khalid's interpretation of Malik's response was that although he and his followers were Muslims, they did not wish to pay taxes to Abu Bakr. Khalid understood this to be a transparent attempt by Malik to save his own life by any means at his disposal. Khalid having clear evidence of Malik's distributing the tax money on getting news of Muhammad's death declared Malik an apostate and ordered his execution. Khalid has to explain himself in the court of Medina.

When he met Abu Bakr, he explained that Malik bin Nawari had killed hundreds of Muslims in the town of Rabaab; followed Sajah bint Tameem and joined forces with her to kill the Muslims, spread her claimed prophethood; refused to give the Zakat; refused to answer back to the call of prayer given before entering upon his people; his wife had already claimed she had been abused by him and kept as a prisoner when she proclaimed her allegiance to Islam and his refusal to name Muhammad by his title of Prophethood. For all these reasons he was killed as an enemy and due to his killings of the Muslims in the town of Rabaab.

References

6th-century births
7th-century deaths
7th-century Arabs
Year of birth missing
Year of death missing